Dover is the southernmost town of its size in Australia, located on the western shores towards the southern end of the D'Entrecasteaux Channel, just south of the Huon Valley, southwest of Hobart, located on the head of Port Esperance in Tasmania. It has a population of 486; 91% were born in Australia and 5% was born in United Kingdom, with other less common origins such as New Zealand, Germany and Greece all clustering around the 1% mark.

Etymology

First recorded in its Latinised form of Portus Dubris, the name derives from the Brythonic word for waters (dwfr in Middle Welsh). The same element is present in the towns French (Douvres) and Modern Welsh (Dofr) forms.

History
The place name of Blubber Head, at the northern entrance to Port Esperance, may indicate shore-based bay whaling activity took place at the location in the 19th century.

Port Esperance Post Office opened on 6 February 1856 and was renamed "Dover" in 1895.

In 2013, the Dover Hotel pub/tavern was destroyed when it was engulfed by a fire.

Climate
Dover has a marine climate (Cfb) with consistently cool, cloudy weather all year round. Despite its southerly latitude and low maximum temperatures, snow and frost are uncommon in winter, however sleet is an occasional occurrence. The highest recorded temperature in Dover was 40.1 °C (104.2 °F) in March 2019, over 20 °C above the March average maximum.

References

Localities of Huon Valley Council
Southern Tasmania